USS Aeolus (SP-186) was the proposed name and designation for a motorboat considered for United States Navy service as a patrol vessel but never acquired.

Aeolus was built in 1915 by Joe Polliot in Detroit, Michigan. The U.S. Navy inspected her for World War I service as a patrol vessel and assigned her the section patrol designation SP-186. However, the Navy never acquired her for service, and she remained in civilian hands.

References
Department of the Navy: Naval Historical Center: Online Library of Selected Images: U.S. Navy Ships: Names Beginning With the Letter A
NavSource Online: Section Patrol Craft Photo Archive Aeolus (SP 186)

Patrol vessels of the United States Navy
Cancelled ships of the United States Navy
Ships built in Detroit
1915 ships